Marvin Donald "Marv" Krohn (born March 5, 1947) is an American criminologist who has been a professor at the University of Florida since 2008.

He was formerly the director of the Division of Criminology, Law and Society there until 2011.

Krohn is currently co-editor of the journal Justice Quarterly.

References

External links
Faculty page

1947 births
Living people
American criminologists
Western Illinois University faculty
University of Iowa faculty
University at Albany, SUNY faculty
University of Florida faculty
College of Wooster alumni
University of Maryland, College Park alumni
Florida State University alumni
People from Glen Ridge, New Jersey